is a railway station in the city of  Hanamaki, Iwate, Japan, operated by East Japan Railway Company (JR East).

Lines
Nitanai Station is served by the Kamaishi Line, and is located 3.5 kilometers from the starting point of the line at Hanamaki Station.

Station layout
The station has a single island platform. The platforms are not numbered. The station is unattended.

Platforms

History
The line was nationalized in 1936, becoming the Kamaishi Line. The station was absorbed into the JR East network upon the privatization of the Japanese National Railways (JNR) on 1 April 1987.

Surrounding area
 Kitakami River
 
 Hanamaki Airport

See also
 List of railway stations in Japan

References

External links

  

Railway stations in Iwate Prefecture
Kamaishi Line
Railway stations in Japan opened in 1913
Hanamaki, Iwate
Stations of East Japan Railway Company